Aliabad Darreh Moshk (also Romanized as ʿ‘Alīābād Darreh Moshk; also known as ‘Alīābād) is a village in Borborud-e Gharbi Rural District, in the Central District of Aligudarz County, Lorestan Province, Iran. At the 2006 census, its population was 29, in 9 families.

References 

Towns and villages in Aligudarz County